Medal events in both men's (4) and women's (2) bodybuilding were included in World Games I. They were held on July 30–31, 1981, at the San Jose Center for the Performing Arts in San Jose, California.  The 1981 Games were the first World Games, an international quadrennial multi-sport event, and were held in California's Santa Clara Valley. In the bodybuilding competition, the preliminary rounds featured two-on-two competition.  Point scoring was based on mandatory posing (front, back and side poses) and optional posing determined by the athlete.  26 of the countries at these Games participated in bodybuilding, making it one of the most represented sports.

Medalists

Results 
Sources:

Men's–Heavyweight
1 John Kemper – USA
2 Wayne Robbins – Canada
3 Achmed Ibrahim – Egypt
4 Manfred Grossler – Austria
5 Rolando Pintoy – Philippines
6 ...

Men's–Light-Heavyweight
1 Jacques Neuville – France
2 Jesse Gautreaux – USA
3 Keijo Reiman – Finland
4 Ulf Bengtsson – Sweden
5 Osamu Usui – Japan
6 Cesar Lopez – Mexico
7 L.K. Adhikary – India
8 ...

Men's–Middleweight
1 James Youngblood – USA
2 Billy Knight – Australia
3 Erwin Note – Belgium
4 Ray Beaulieu – Canada
5 Lucien Gunther – Holland
6 Michel Dermaux – Belgium
7 Paijo Bin Jemadi – Malaysia, tie
7 Teh Ah Fook – Malaysia, tie
9 Vicente Segovia – Spain
10 Michael Hekel – Switzerland
11 Moloy Roy – India

Men's–Lightweight
1 Renato Bertagna – Italy
2 Esmat Sadek – Egypt
3 Joseph Disinti – USA
4 Harry Derglin – Switzerland
5 Ralph Lopez – Puerto Rico
6 Guillermo Franco – Guatemala
7 Katsumi Ishimura – Japan
8 Luis Guzman – Puerto Rico

Women's–Middleweight
1 Kike Elomaa – Finland
2 Gail Schroeter – USA
3 Deborah Diana – USA
4 Carla Dunlap – USA
5 Kay Baxter-Wick – USA
6 Shelley Gruwell – USA
7 Linda McCrerey – USA
8 Joanne Cameron – USA
9 Vera Cools – Belgium
10 Carole Bennett – Australia
11 Lynne Bergmame – Canada
12 Marlene Fuhrer – Switzerland
13 Leia Kawaii – USA
14 Monika Chevalley – Switzerland

Women's–Lightweight
1 Pam Brooks – USA
2 Josee Baumgartner – France
3 Christine Reed – USA
4 Debbie Trenholm – USA
5 Jacqueline Roos – Holland
6 Kathy Basacker – USA
7 Josiane Jamar – Belgium
8 Stella Martinez – USA
9 Dagmar Zuso – Switzerland
9(?) Susan Roberts – USA
11 Sue Tonks – England
12 Carla York – USA
13 Terri Miladinovich – USA
14 Milda Graham – Canada
15 Kathleen Cosentino – USA
16 Kathy Tuite – USA
17 Michelle Tennier – Canada
18 Wendy Daniels – Canada
19 Claudine Turin – Switzerland
20 Terri Buhne – Australia

Other competitors expected prior to Games – United States: Madeline Almeida, Susan Bressler, Gary Leonard, Ernie Santiago, Richard Baldin, John Burkholder; Singapore: Moh Teck Hin

References

External links
 

1981
1981 World Games
1981 in bodybuilding